In the Heart of the Woods is a 1915 American silent short drama film directed by Tom Ricketts and written by Marion Heffernan. Starring  Louise Lester, Vivian Rich, Harry von Meter, David Lythgoe and Charles Morrison.

Cast
 Louise Lester as Miriam Stern
 David Lythgoe as Jack Daley
 Vivian Rich as Nance Morgan
 Harry von Meter as Ben Morgan
 Charles Morrison

External links

1915 films
1915 drama films
Silent American drama films
American silent short films
American black-and-white films
1915 short films
Films directed by Tom Ricketts
1910s American films
1910s English-language films
American drama short films